Metasville is an unincorporated community in Wilkes County, in the U.S. state of Georgia.

History
The community perhaps derives its name from Metacomet, an Indian chieftain. A post office called Metasville was established in 1887, and remained in operation until 1944.

The Georgia General Assembly incorporated Metasville as a town in 1917. The town's municipal charter was repealed in 1995.

References

Former municipalities in Georgia (U.S. state)
Unincorporated communities in Wilkes County, Georgia
Unincorporated communities in Georgia (U.S. state)
Populated places disestablished in 1995